Hippophae rhamnoides, also known as sea-buckthorn, is a species of flowering plant in the family Elaeagnaceae, native to the cold-temperate regions of Europe and Asia. It is a spiny deciduous shrub. The plant is used in the food and cosmetics industries, in traditional medicine, as animal fodder, in horticulture, and for ecological purposes.

Description and biology 

Hippophae rhamnoides is a hardy, deciduous shrub that can grow between 2 and 4 m high (between 7 and 13 ft). It has a rough, brown or black bark and a thick, grayish-green crown. The leaves are alternate, narrow and lanceolate, with silvery-green upper faces. It is dioecious, meaning that the male and female flowers grow on different shrubs. The sex of seedlings can only be determined at the first flowering, which mostly occurs after three years. The male inflorescence is built up of four to six apetalous flowers, while the female inflorescence normally consists of only one apetalous flower and contains one ovary and one ovule. Fertilization occurs solely via wind pollination, so male plants need to be close to female plants to allow for fertilization and fruit production.

The oval or lightly roundish fruits grow in compact grapes varying from pale yellow to dark orange. Individual fruits weigh between 270 and 480 mg and contain high amounts of vitamin C, vitamin E, carotenoids, flavonoids and health-beneficial fatty acids, as well as higher amounts of vitamin B12 than other fruits.

The plants have a very developed and extensive root system, and the roots live in symbiosis with nitrogen-fixing Frankia bacteria. The roots also transform insoluble organic and mineral matters from the soil into more soluble states. Vegetative reproduction of the plants occurs rapidly via root suckers.

Taxonomy 

Hippophae rhamnoides is situated in the family Elaeagnaceae, in the order Rosales.

Hippophae rhamnoides is divided into eight subspecies: ssp. carpatica, caucasia, fluviatilis, mongolica, rhamnoides, sinensis, turkestanica and yunnanensis. These subspecies vary in size, shape, number of main lateral veins in the leaves and quantity and color of stellate hairs. They also have different areas of distribution and specific uses.

The genus name Hippophae originates from the Greek words hippo = "horse" and phaos = "to shine" and is due to the ancient Greek use of sea buckthorn leaves as horse fodder to make their coats shine more. The species name rhamnoides means "resembling the Rhamnus", referring to the buckthorn plant.

Distribution 

Hippophae rhamnoides is native to the cold-temperate regions of Europe and Asia, between 27 and 69EN latitude and 7EW and 122EE longitude. These regions include the Baltic Coasts of Finland, Poland and Germany, the Gulf of Bothnia in Sweden, as well as coastal areas of the United Kingdom and the Netherlands. In Asia, H. rhamnoides can be found in the northern regions of China, throughout most of the Himalayan region, including India, Nepal and Bhutan, Pakistan and Afghanistan. It is found in a variety of locations: on hills and hillsides, valleys, riverbeds, along coastal regions, on islands, in small isolated or continuous pure stands, but also in mixed stands with other shrub and tree species.  H. rhamnoides has also recently been planted in countries such as Canada, the United States, Bolivia, Chile, Japan and South Korea.

The current total acreage of H. rhamnoides is about 3.0 million ha worldwide. This number includes both wild and cultivated plants. Of these, approximately 2.5 million ha are situated in China (1.0 million ha of wild plants and 1.5 million ha in plantations), 20 000 ha in Mongolia, 12 000 ha in India and 3 000 ha in Pakistan. This makes China the largest agricultural producer of H. rhamnoides. Approximately 10 000 acres of the plant are planted in China each year for berry production as well as eco-environmental improvement. As of 2003, approximately 100 km of field shelterbelts were planted in Canada each year, and over 250 000 mature fruit-producing plants were grown on the Canadian prairies with an estimated annual fruit supply of 750 000 kg. Other countries that grow H. rhamnoides as an agricultural plant include for example Germany and France.

Composition

Fruit
Sea buckthorn fruit contains sugars, sugar alcohols, fruit acids, vitamins (C, E, and K), polyphenols, carotenoids, fiber, amino acids, minerals, and plant sterols. Species belonging to genus Hippophae accumulate oil both in soft parts and in seed of the fruit. Oil content in soft parts is 1.5–3.0%, while in seed this is 11% of the fresh weight. For the compositions of sea buckthorn oils, see article: sea buckthorn oil.

Major sugars in sea buckthorn fruits are fructose and glucose, with total sugar content of 2.7–5.3 g/100 ml of juice. Typical sourness of the fruits is due to high content of malic acid (0.8-3.2 g/100 ml of juice) while astringency is related to quinic acid (1.2-2.1 g/100 ml of juice). Major sugar alcohol in fruit is L-quebrachitol (0.15–0.24 g/100 ml of juice).

The fruit of the plant has a high vitamin C content – approximately 400 mg per 100 grams, placing sea buckthorn fruit among the richest plant sources of vitamin C. Additionally, fruits have high concentrations of carotenoids, vitamin E and vitamin K.
The main carotenoids are beta-carotene, zeaxanthin and lycopene while alpha-tocopherol is the major vitamin E compound.

The most prevalent dietary minerals in sea buckthorn fruits are potassium (300–380 mg/100 g), manganese (0.28–0.32 mg/100 g), and copper (0.1 mg/100 g).

The fruit is also rich in phytosterols (340–520 mg/kg), β-sitosterol being the major sterol compound as it constitutes 57–83% of total sterols.

Flavonols were found to be the predominating class of phenolic compounds, while phenolic acids and flavan-3-ols (catechins) represent minor components.

Uses
Hippophae rhamnoides is a very versatile plant and the fruits as well as the leaves can be used. The fruits are processed and then used in the food industry, in traditional medicine, as part of drugs or in the cosmetic industry. The leaves can be used as feed, particularly for ruminants. Because of its tolerance against strongly eroded, nutrient-poor and sometimes salty soils, the plant is also used for land reclamation or as shelterbelt.

Consumer products
In general, all parts of the H. rhamnoides contain diverse phytochemicals and nutrients. Particularly the fruit contains high vitamin C amounts, exceeding the levels seen in lemons and oranges. H. rhamnoides fruits are processed in the food industry to different products. Usually, the berries are first washed and then pressed, resulting in pomace and juice. The fruit pomace can be used to obtain oil, natural food color (yellow/orange) or jam, while the juice is further processed and packaged as a consumer product. H. rhamnoides oil may be used to produce cosmetics, such as hand cream, shampoo or massage oils. The leaves of the shrub can be air dried, eventually ground, and used for tea.

Traditional medicine 
Hippophae rhamnoides is widely used in traditional medicine, particularly in Russia and Northeast Asia. The leaves are used as supposed herbal medicine for various disorders. H. rhamnoides fruits have also been used in the traditional Austrian medicine internally as tea, juice, or syrup for treatment of infections.

Livestock fodder 
Hippophae rhamnoides is used for feeding livestock. The pomace from H. rhamnoides fruit processing can be used as animal feed, such as for poultry feeding.

Ecology 
The H. rhamnoides plant is particularly drought- and salt-tolerant and can thus be successfully used for land reclamation, against further soil erosion, as shelterbelt or in agroforestry. These characteristics are mainly due to the deep root system that the plant develops. For example, in eastern China, new agroforestry systems have been developed to reclaim land with high salinity contents and H. rhamnoides is included in the system as shelterbelt, providing a habitat to different birds and small mammals.

Cultivation

Soil and climate requirements 
In nature H. rhamnoides is found growing profusely on a wide range of soil types, but does better in soils with a light physical structure, rich in nutrient compounds and with a pH near neutral (pH 6.5–7.5). Best growth occurs in deep, well drained, sandy loam with ample organic matter. Very light, sandy soils have low water carrying capacity and are also low in nutrient mineral elements; so without the previous addition of organic matter, are not appropriate. Similarly inappropriate are clayey soils, with high density and water retention characteristics.
H. rhamnoides is considered drought resistant but it is a moisture sensitive plant especially in the spring when plants are flowering and young fruits are beginning to develop. Planting in arid or semiarid areas is possible, if water is supplied for establishment.
It can bear fruits at altitudes up to 2000 m above sea level. The plant can withstand temperatures from −43 °C to + 40 °C. Vegetation begins at average daily air temperatures of 5 to 7 °C. It flowers at temperatures 10 to 15 °C and requires total effective temperatures, spring to harvest time, of 14.5 °C to 17.5 °C, depending on latitude, elevation and species. Frost hardiness is the highest in deep dormancy in November and December. During this period, negative temperatures of −50 °C may be tolerated. Whereas in the post-dormant period in January to March, the critical temperature drops in air temperature for the male to −30 °C to −35 °C and for the female, −40 °C to −45 °C. H. rhamnoides can only be grown in well-lit, unshaded areas. Starting from its very earliest stage of development, it can not tolerate shade.
As for fertilization, phosphorus is indispensable for the normal life process of the nodules on the roots. The plant requires little nitrogen, due to its ability to fix nitrogen.

Planting 
Hippophae rhamnoides needs a period of 4 to 5 years from the appearance of the first shoots from the seeds to the beginning of fruit and peaks at the 7–8th year of plant life, remaining productive for 30 years with intermittent pruning. Spring is the best time for planting H. rhamnoides. An orchard planting can yield 10 tonnes of berries per hectare. A number of seeds per planting site is recommended at spacing of 1 m within the row and 4 m between the rows, south-east sloping terrain is recommended to facilitate the maximum sunlight exposure and rows should be oriented in a north– south direction to provide maximum light.

Pruning 
The purpose of pruning H. rhamnoides is to train branches, promote growth and facilitate harvesting. Moderate pruning will increase the yield and fruiting life of the plants. The crown should be pruned to remove overlapping branches, and long branches should be cut to encourage development of lateral shoots. Mature fruiting plants should be pruned to allow more light penetration. Pruning is also recommended to eliminate thorns on the mature wood to facilitate harvesting. Pruning should be started the year trees have been planted, late winter pruning is best time.

Propagation 
Seed propagation is not commonly used in orchards because the species is dioecious, therefore the sex cannot be determined in the seed, or prior to 3 to 4 years of growth. And male plants must be replaced. If seedlings of unknown sex are planted, it may result in an uneven distribution of male and female plants. To avoid this problem, excessive male plants are replaced with female plants, or vegetative propagation from mature plants of known sex is done.
With vegetative propagation, the cuttings will bear fruit 1 to 2 years earlier than seed propagated trees and the genetics and sex are known from the mother plant. Sea buckthorn can be propagated using either hardwood or softwood cuttings, root cuttings, layering and suckers. 
Cross-pollination is by wind action only. The ratio and distance of male to female plants is important, as the number of female trees in each planting directly affects the total yield. Recommendations for male and female ratio vary from 6 to 12%, while the distance within which the female plant can be pollinated is about 100m. It has been shown that as the distance from the female plant to the male plant (polliniser) increases (64m), the yield of the female plant decreases.

Breeding 
The large morphological diversity is a good indication for opportunities in selection of desired characteristics for a given region. Mass selection is still practiced in many areas, although it is gradually replaced by hybridization and polyploidy breeding. The most important characteristics that need improvement are: yield, fruit size, winter hardness, thornlessness, fruit and pollen quality and early maturity, long pedicel (to facilitate mechanical harvest) and nitrogen fixing ability.

Harvesting and challenges in mechanization 

The fruits ripen in the fall and frequently cling on the shrub until the following March/April. Good plants will produce up to  annually. In Asia the fruits are harvested by hand; this process requires about 1500 person-hours/ha. Fruit harvest is the most time consuming operation in growing H. rhamnoides. The relatively small fruit size, short pedicel, force required to pull off each fruit, the density of fruit on the branch, and the thorniness of the plant, are the disadvantages during harvesting.

Difficulties in harvesting are the major barriers of orchard production and development of the plant's potential as a cash crop. Harvesting the fruit is problematic because the fruit does not easily release from the stem. Different mechanical harvest methods were developed in the late 20th century, such as shaking, vacuum and quick freezing, but with the disadvantages of fruit and bark damage and low efficiency, as of 1990. Except when frozen on the shrub, fresh fruit mechanical harvesting is still in the development stage during the early 21st century. This is mainly due to the difficulty in separating the stem (pedicel) from the berry (pericarp). Mechanical harvesting – with the sequence of cutting a branch from the tree, freezing it, then shaking the branch to release the berries – eliminates the necessity for maintenance pruning, leaving a hedge that has been uniformly cut back, with high-quality berries. A trunk clamp-on vibrator harvester may be used when the fruit is frozen on the shrub, but with this method leaf and wood contamination is high and an additional step of berry cleaning is necessary.

Cultivars
In the United Kingdom, the cultivars 'Leikora' and 'Pollmix' have won the Royal Horticultural Society’s Award of Garden Merit. 'Leikora' is a dense-fruit cultivar, while 'Pollmix' is used as a pollinator for female clones.

Interactions

Symbionts 

Hippophae rhamnoides plants that are 1–2 years old develop root nodules containing actinobacteria of the genus Frankia, which are capable of fixing nitrogen. As a result of this relationship, the soils in stands of H. rhamnoides are enriched in nitrogen. The nitrogen-fixing activity of the symbiotic bacteria is not constant, but depends on external factors such as the climate or whether additional nitrogen fertilization occurred.

Diseases and insect pests 

Both in Asia and in Europe, sea buckthorn losses occur notably due to environmental stress, wilt disease and insect pests. It is estimated that more than 60,000 ha of natural and planted sea buckthorn stands have died in China since the year 2000 due to these three factors, and approximately 5,000 ha perish each year.

Wilt disease 

Wilt disease is a combination of fungal diseases that is sometimes also called "dried-shrink disease", "shrivelled disease", "dry rot" or "dry atrophy". In China, it causes fruit yield losses of 30–40% and annual losses of mature plantations of 4 000 ha. Several pathogens have been described as causing the sickness in sea buckthorn:
 the genus Fusarium (Fusarium wilt): F. acuminatum, F. camptoceras and F. oxysporum, as well as F. rhizoctonia and F. solani and F. sporotrichioides
 the genus Stigmina
 the genus Verticillium (Verticillium wilt): V. albo-atrum and V. dahliae
 the species Plowrightia hippophaes
 the species Phellinus hippophaeicola
 the species Phomopsis spp.

Methods to control the disease include removing and burning infected branches, not replanting H. rhamnoides at the same site for 3–5 years, and avoiding to make cuttings from infected plants. Antagonistic fungi like Trichoderma sp. or Penicillium sp. can be used to combat wilt disease in plants infected by Plowrightia hippophaes. Additionally, four strains of Cladothrix actinomyces were found to be usable as antagonistic fungi in H. rhamnoides plants infected by Fusarium sporotrichioides. Cultivars of H. rhamnoides that were relatively resistant to wilt disease have also been identified.

Pests 

Hippophae rhamnoides is affected by several insect pests, of which green aphids (Capitophorus hippophaes) are one of the most damaging. They are usually found in the new growth on shoot tips where they stunt growth and cause yellowing of the leaves. This is then followed by shrinking of the leaves along their central vein, after which they drop prematurely.
Another serious pest is the seabuckthorn fruit fly (Rhagoletis batava), whose larvae feed on the fruit flesh, rendering the fruits unsuitable for use.
H. rhamnoides is also affected by the gall tick (Vasates spp.), which causes gall formation on the leaves and thereby leads to deformation of the leaf surface.
Both the leaf roller (Archips rosana) and the gypsy moth (Lymantria dispar) chew on H. rhamnoides leaves. The leaf roller occurs from May to July, while the gypsy moth occurs later in the summer.
Further insect pests include the commashaped scale (Chionaspis salicis), which sucks sap from the bark and can cause important damage by leading to the death of the plant, and the larvae of the sea buckthorn moth (Gelechia hippophaella), which penetrate into fresh buds and feed on them. Thrips, and occasionally earwigs have also been observed as affecting H. rhamnoides.

Insecticides such as gammaxene and dylox are used to control insect pests in the soil, and insecticide soap can be employed against green aphid infestations

Hippophae rhamnoides is also involved in interactions with various animals (birds, rodents, deer, livestock) that can lead to damage in plantations.

Weed control 
Weed control is important, especially during the early growth stages of H. rhamnoides, since it grows slower than weeds due to its less vigorous root system. Weeds should be removed before planting by preparing the land adequately, and they should subsequently be controlled during the first four to five years, until the shrubs are high enough to shade out the weeds. Weed control is done both mechanically and manually. Weeding should however not be too deep so as not to damage the root system of H. rhamnoides.

As of 2003, no herbicides were registered for use in orchards of H. rhamnoides.

References

External links

rhamnoides
Flora of Europe
Flora of temperate Asia
Flora of the Indian subcontinent
Medicinal plants of Asia
Medicinal plants of Europe
Plants described in 1753
Taxa named by Carl Linnaeus
Fruit trees